Hot Lips Pizza is a chain of pizza restaurants in the Portland, Oregon, area. It is known for using local, organic ingredients in its pizzas.

History
Hot Lips Pizza was founded in 1984 by David Yudkin's father-in-law. Yudkin and his wife, Jeana Edelman, took over the business in 1994. In 2005, Hot Lips started selling fruit sodas made from local fruits. The sodas were featured in The New York Times. In 2011, Hot Lips made its millionth bottle of soda.

Environmental practices

Many of Hot Lips' ingredients are bought from local farmers, especially from farmers' markets. It also makes all of its packaging compostable. Waste heat from the ovens at their Pearl District location is used to heat the whole restaurant.

See also
 Pizza in Portland, Oregon

References

External links

Hot Lips Soda website

1984 establishments in Oregon
Italian-American culture in Portland, Oregon
Pizza chains of the United States
Pizzerias in Portland, Oregon
Regional restaurant chains in the United States
Restaurants established in 1984